Presidential elections were held in Honduras on 15 February 1864. The result was a victory for José María Medina.

Background
In 1863 Guatemala invaded Honduras and removed President José Francisco Montes from office. José María Medina, who had travelled with the Guatemalan army, was proclaimed President on 26 June. On 31 December Medina temporarily gave up the presidency to Francisco Inestroza to allow him to contest forthcoming elections.

Results

References

Honduras
1864 in Honduras
Presidential elections in Honduras
Election and referendum articles with incomplete results